Thomas V. Hatch (fl. 2000s) is a Republican former politician from Southern Utah.  He served as chair of the Garfield County, Utah Board of Commissioners, state representative and state senator, retiring from the later post at the end of 2006.

Hatch served as chairman of the Utah House Rules Committee as well as a member of the Executive Appropriations Committee. In 2001 Hatch was elected Majority Leader in the House of Representatives. Among other positions Hatch served on the natural resources appropriation committee.

Sources
report mentioning Hatch

County commissioners in Utah
Living people
Utah state senators
Members of the Utah House of Representatives
21st-century American politicians
Year of birth missing (living people)